Henri Salaun may refer to:
Henri Salaun (admiral), French admiral
Henri Salaun (squash player), French-born American squash player, grandson of the above